Gossard Limited is a Nottingham-based producer of women's undergarments and hosiery. Founded in the early 20th century in Chicago as H. W. Gossard Co., it expanded quickly, flourishing in the 1920s. As Associated Apparel Industries, Inc. it held a central position in its market in the 1930s. Amalgamated eventually succumbed to the poor economy in the United States during the Great Depression, but Gossard continues as a division of Courtaulds in Great Britain.

History
Gossard was established as H. W. Gossard Co. in Chicago in 1901, per company history, after its founder Henry Williamson Gossard was inspired by a corset worn at a Paris performance by the actress Sarah Bernhardt. This performance, “L’Aiglon“, she played the role of a boy, and wore a made to measure corset which sculpted and refined the silhouette. Captivated by the look of this corset, H. W. Gossard decided to import the concept to America and market it. In the 1920s it introduced the then-revolutionary idea of putting corset ties on the front, allowing the wearer to untie them herself. The company advertised extensively under the slogan "The Gossard Line of Beauty."

In 1928 the company was reorganized as a division of Associated Apparel Industries, Inc. The manufacturer became a conglomerate after acquiring Venus Company and Lamode Garment Company, adding $3,000,000 in annual revenue. Associated Apparel, Inc., planned to build a plant in Germany, and its president, R. C. Stirton, sailed for Europe in May 1929 to facilitate this. When World War rages, Gossard produces parachutes, sails, and bras for women of the English navy.

Stockholders of Nature's Rival Company, a firm previously acquired by Associated Apparel, Inc., brought a bankruptcy petition against Amalgamated in September 1933. The suit was filed in the United States District Court in Chicago. It asked for a sum of  $1,232,500.

After the bankruptcy, the company reformed as H. W. Gossard but became a British company. It continued to manufacture women's underwear and hosiery, and R. C. Stirton continued as its president until his death in 1945.

Gossard was acquired by Courtaulds in 1959. At some point it became a property of the French DBApparel, but was re-acquired by Courtalds in 2007.

In the 1970s Gossard introduced "Glossies", a brand designed for a transparent and iridescent appearance. Glossies became a preferred lingerie brand in a time of sexual revolution and women's liberation. Gossard developed larger sizes of Glossies in DD to accommodate the changing figures of women of the time.

Advertising Campaigns 
In 1994 the famous "Hello Boys" advertising campaign for Gossards Wonderbra featuring model Eva Herzigová caused such a stir that, in 2011, it was voted "the greatest poster of all time."

In 1996 Sophie Anderton appeared in the Gossard Glossies "Girl in the grass" national advertising campaign shot by Herb Ritts, which included the tag line "Who said a woman couldn't get pleasure from something soft?" The campaign attracted a record number of complaints (321) to the Advertising Standards Authority, none of which were upheld.

In 2002 Gossard introduced their G-String models, which immediately sold out. The G-Strings with diamantes and the signature "G" logo became very popular in the 2000s. Emma Willis was announced as the face off Gossard, a "Gossard Girl" this year for the Showtime reimagining of Belle Epoque.

Following an appearance on Celebrity Big Brother 2013, Gossard girl Sophie Anderton recreated her iconic "bed of hay" Glossies campaign 17 years after the original. Now aged 36 Anderton was quoted saying "I'm now a woman not a young girl. So I feel I embrace my body more and I am definitely more confident than I was at 19. I couldn't believe when Gossard booked me the first time, it was very surreal. But this time it was like returning home."

In December 2014, Olympia Valance became the new face and body of Gossard. Of her role, she said "The last year has been a whirlwind and to work with such an established name as Gossard is a dream come true. I absolutely love working on Neighbours and the fact that I am able to come over to England and do an incredible campaign like this is a credit to the show's following, both here and down under." Valance has appeared in photo shoots for the brand's swimwear and lingerie collections, including their 2015 spring/summer campaign.

In 2022 Gossard released the "I am Enough" campaign, celebrating body positivity. Gossard have developed the size range further to G.

References



Manufacturing companies disestablished in 1959
Clothing companies established in 1901
1901 establishments in Illinois
1959 disestablishments in England
1959 mergers and acquisitions
Lingerie brands
Lingerie retailers
British fashion